Celeste Olalquiaga is a Venezuelan-born independent scholar. She is the author of The Artificial Kingdom: A Treasury of the Kitsch Experience (1999) and Megalopolis: Contemporary Cultural Sensibilities. She received a grant from the Rockefeller Foundation in 1994 and a Guggenheim Fellowship in 1996. She writes the column "Object Lesson" for the publication Cabinet.

References

External links
Official website

Venezuelan women writers
Rockefeller Fellows
Living people
Year of birth missing (living people)
Place of birth missing (living people)